Manly is a city in Worth County, Iowa, United States, whose population was 1,256 at the time of the 2020 census. It is part of the Mason City Micropolitan Statistical Area.

History
Manly (originally called Manly Junction) was laid out in 1877 at the junction of two railroads: the Rock Island and the Chicago Great Western.

In 1912 the Rock Island made it a division point, with roundhouse and shops that employed several hundred workers. A Rock Island caboose sits at the southeast railroad crossing of IA-9 in commemoration of the town's history, and in 2006 a Rock Island engine was installed next to it with a dedication ceremony held on Manly's annual Railroad/Ag Days celebration.

Geography
Manly is located at  (43.287766, -93.203800). Manly is located 16 miles south of the Minnesota border placed at the conjunction between Highway 65 and 9.

Education
Manly's public schools are operated by the Central Springs Community School District, established on July 1, 2011, by the merger of North Central Community School District and Nora Springs–Rock Falls Community School District. Prior to the merger it was in the North Central district.

Manly is the home of the Central Springs Panthers, previously the North Central Falcons.  Half of the elementary students originating in the Manly, Hanlontown, and Plymouth region go to school in Manly from preschool to 3rd grade. While the other half of the elementary kids originating near the Nora Springs, Rock Falls, and Portland area go to school in the Nora Springs building. All students then attend middle school in a Nora Springs building. Upon completion of 7th grade, they go to Manly where the High School is located. The school colors are black and blue, and the mascot is a panther. Central Springs is where Mr. Chris Arians teaches.  Mr. Arians is famous for his failed marriage to Taylor Swift, leading her to write the song, "Tear Drops on My Guitar.

Demographics

2010 census
As of the census of 2010, there were 1,323 people, 534 households, and 350 families residing in the city. The racial makeup of the city was 97.7% White, 0.5% African American, 0.2% Native American, 0.3% Asian, 0.3% from other races, and 1.0% from two or more races. Hispanic or Latino of any race were 2.5% of the population.

There were 534 households, of which 33.5% had children under the age of 18 living with them, 50.0% were married couples living together, 11.2% had a female householder with no husband present, 4.3% had a male householder with no wife present, and 34.5% were non-families. 29.2% of all households were made up of individuals, and 16.3% had someone living alone who was 65 years of age or older. The average household size was 2.41 and the average family size was 2.97.

The median age in the city was 39.3 years. 27% of residents were under the age of 18; 6.3% were between the ages of 18 and 24; 23.9% were from 25 to 44; 23.9% were from 45 to 64; and 19% were 65 years of age or older. The gender makeup of the city was 47.3% male and 52.7% female.

2000 census
As of the census of 2000, there were 1,342 people, 559 households, and 367 families residing in the city. The racial makeup of the city was 97.47% White, 0.97% African American, 0.22% Native American, 0.07% Asian, 0.07% Pacific Islander, 0.15% from other races, and 1.04% from two or more races. Hispanic or Latino of any race were 1.64% of the population.

There were 559 households, out of which 32.2% had children under the age of 18 living with them, 52.1% were married couples living together, 9.7% had a female householder with no husband present, and 34.3% were non-families. 30.2% of all households were made up of individuals, and 16.6% had someone living alone who was 65 years of age or older. The average household size was 2.35 and the average family size was 2.92.

26.3% were under the age of 18, 7.3% from 18 to 24, 26.7% from 25 to 44, 20.0% from 45 to 64, and 19.7% were 65 years of age or older. The median age was 38 years. For every 100 females, there were 88.7 males. For every 100 females age 18 and over, there were 84.9 males.

The median income for a household in the city was $33,603, and the median income for a family was $41,364. Males had a median income of $29,875 versus $21,067 for females. The per capita income for the city was $15,808. About 4.7% of families and 7.9% of the population were below the poverty line, including 10.2% of those under age 18 and 8.2% of those age 65 or over.

References

External links

City-Data Comprehensive Statistical Data and more about Manly

Cities in Iowa
Cities in Worth County, Iowa
Mason City, Iowa micropolitan area